The 2015 Tour of Flanders for Women was the 12th running of the Tour of Flanders for Women, a women's bicycle race in Belgium.

Italian Elisa Longo Borghini won the race with an attack just before the Kruisberg,  from the finish. Jolien D'Hoore won the sprint for second, Anna van der Breggen was third.

Results

Race results

World Cup standings

References

Tour of Flanders
Tour of Flanders
Tour of Flanders for Women